Worta J. McCaskill-Stevens is an American physician-scientist and medical oncologist specialized in cancer disparities research, management of comorbidities within clinical trials, and molecular research for cancer prevention interventions. She is chief of the community oncology and prevention trials research group at the National Cancer Institute.

Early life and education 
McCaskill-Stevens was born in Louisburg, North Carolina. She attended Washington University in St. Louis and the American College of Switzerland. McCaskill-Stevens worked as an intern for Time and as a medical editor for Marcel Dekker and the Guttmacher Institute. At Georgetown University School of Medicine, she started medical school at the age of 30, earning a M.D. in 1985 and completing an internal medicine residency. McCaskill-Stevens did a medical oncology fellowship at the Mayo Clinic.

Career and research 

McCaskill-Stevens, a medical oncologist, joined the National Cancer Institute (NCI) in 1998 as the program director for the study of tamoxifen and raloxifene (STAR), and assumed responsibilities for breast cancer prevention with the community clinical oncology program (CCOP). She chaired the 2009 National Institutes of Health (NIH) State-of-the Science Conference on ductal carcinoma in situ; is a member of the early breast cancer clinical trialist group in Oxford; and is a member of NCI’s breast cancer steering committee. McCaskill-Stevens co-directed the breast care and research center at the Indiana University Cancer Center. 

McCaskill-Stevens is chief of the community oncology and prevention trials research group, which houses the NCI community oncology research program (NCORP), a community-based clinical trials network launched in 2014. As NCORP director, she oversees the program supporting community hospitals, physicians and others to participate in NCI-approved cancer treatment, prevention, screening, and control clinical trials, as well as cancer care delivery studies. 

McCaskill-Stevens' interests include cancer disparities research both nationally and internationally, management of comorbidities within clinical trials and molecular research that helps to identify those individuals who will best benefit from cancer prevention interventions. She worked with the Study of Tamoxifen and Raloxifene (STAR), as the program director.

Awards and honors 
In 2016, she was the recipient of the American Association for Cancer Research Jane Cooke Wright Memorial Lectureship. Her other honors and awards include: the Kaiser Family Fund Award for Excellence in Academic Achievement and Leadership in Medicine; Omega Alpha Medical Honor Society; the NIH Director’s Award for Clinical Trials; the NCI Merit Award for breast cancer prevention; and listed on Ebony’s 2013 Power 100 – Most Influential African Americans in Science and Health. In 2017, she received an honorary Doctor of Science from her alma mater, Georgetown University. McCaskill-Stevens was the recipient of the 2020 ACCC David King Community Clinical Scientist Award, from The Association of Community Cancer Centers (ACCC).  Winners of the prestigious David King Award have "demonstrated leadership in the development, participation, and evaluation of clinical studies and/or are active in the development of new screening, risk assessment, treatment, or supportive care programs for cancer patients."

References 

Living people
Year of birth missing (living people)
20th-century births
Washington University in St. Louis alumni
National Institutes of Health people
People from Louisburg, North Carolina
20th-century American women physicians
20th-century American women scientists
21st-century American women scientists
21st-century American women physicians
American oncologists
Women oncologists
Women medical researchers
American medical researchers
African-American women physicians
African-American physicians
African-American women scientists
Scientists from North Carolina
Physicians from North Carolina
Cancer researchers
20th-century American physicians
20th-century American scientists
21st-century American physicians
21st-century American scientists
Georgetown University School of Medicine alumni